A list of films produced by the Marathi language film industry based in Maharashtra in the year 1974.

1974 Releases
A list of Marathi films released in 1974.

References

Lists of 1974 films by country or language
1974 in Indian cinema
1974